The West Nyanza languages are a subgroup of the Great Lakes Bantu languages spoken in Uganda, Tanzania and the DRC.

History
People spoke proto-West Nyanza in the first half of the first millennium CE and their descendants in turn formed two speech communities, one speaking Proto-Rutara and the other Proto-North Nyanza. North Nyanza began to be spoken as a language on the northwestern shore of Lake Victoria in the eighth century CE while Proto-Rutara remained in the Kagera Region. Many of the northern Rutara peoples (whose descendants founded Kitara) migrating northwestwards into the drier and more open woody savanna grasslands of western Uganda developed a political economy based mostly on intensive Cattle keeping and cereal growing (especially of Finger millet) while the North Nyanza peoples (whose descendants founded Buganda and Busoga) created a land-intensive political economy around their banana and plantain groves and fishing near the very well-watered shores of Lake victoria. Some Rutarans who stayed behind in Kagera near Lake Victoria like the Haya also built their food system around the Banana garden. The Zinza people migrated to southern Kagera and the southeastern shores of lake victoria while the Kerewe people migrated further eastwards to their present territory on the southeastern side of Lake Victoria

References

Great Lakes Bantu languages